Kate Rockwell may refer to:

 Kathleen "Kate" Rockwell (born 1873), American vaudeville performer
 Kate Rockwell (actress) (born 1984), American actress